The Moroccan football club Ittihad Tanger (IR Tanger), since its foundation in 1983, has played in the first and second divisions of the Botola league. It came top of the league for the first time in 2017–18. The club has three times reached the semifinals of the Moroccan Throne Cup.

League and cup

23 seasons in Botola
16 seasons in Botola 2

African competitions

f First leg.
Notes
 PR: Preliminary round
 1R: First round
 PO: Play-off round

Arab competitions

Notes
 PR: Preliminary round

Ittihad Tanger